Call of Duty: Warzone 2.0 is a free-to-play battle royale video game developed by Infinity Ward and Raven Software for PlayStation 4, PlayStation 5, Windows, Xbox One, and Xbox Series X/S. It is a sequel to 2020's Call of Duty: Warzone. The game is a part of 2022's Call of Duty: Modern Warfare II but does not require purchase of the aforementioned title. It was introduced during Season 1 of Modern Warfare II content. The game features cross-platform play and a new extraction mode titled DMZ.

Warzone 2.0 was officially revealed by Activision at Call of Duty Next in September 2022, was released on November 16, 2022, and is part of a single cross-game launcher known as Call of Duty HQ.

Overview

Gameplay 
Similar to its predecessor, in Warzone 2.0s primary game mode, Battle Royale, players compete in a continuously shrinking map to be the last player(s) remaining. Players parachute onto a large game map, where they encounter and eliminate other players. As the game progresses and players are eliminated, the playable area shrinks, forcing the remaining players into tighter spaces. A new feature in Warzone 2.0, Circle Collapse, allows multiple circles to spawn within the map, which close independently of one another, before converging into one single safe zone. Like the first Warzone, upon death, players are sent to the "Gulag", a small-sized arena where killed players battle one another for a chance at respawning into the map. In Warzone 2.0, Gulag matches were initially introduced in 2v2 format, and included an AI combatant called "the Jailer", whom players can hunt down to acquire a key and escape, in addition to the traditional method of winning Gulag matches. This change was reverted for Season 2 to the original 1v1 format, while the Jailer is also removed in favor of the overtime point capture system. In-game cash currencies also return, allowing players to buy various items at several buy stations scattered across the map, including custom loadouts with personalized weapons and perk setups.

Artificial intelligence (AI) combatants are featured more prominently in Warzone 2.0, as they defend various strongholds throughout the main map. Players can choose to engage in combat with the AI-controlled enemies in order to seize the strongholds and gain access to the loot items within.

A new extraction game mode, named DMZ, is also featured at the release of Warzone 2.0. In DMZ, players battle against both AI-controlled and player-controlled opponents while attempting to exfil with loot they found within the playable area (also known as the Exclusion Zone). Players start out with a limited inventory, which allows storage of extracted loot from matches; said inventory can be expanded by completing Faction missions, allowing for more guaranteed loadout weapon slots or the opportunity to unlock base weapons and cosmetic rewards, usable in both Warzone 2.0 and Modern Warfare II.

In Season 2, Warzone 2.0 features the return of Resurgence, a game mode in which player combatants can respawn and rejoin matches after being killed, provided that at least one member in their squad remains alive following a short cooldown period. Squad members can help reduce the cooldown period by completing contracts or killing other players.

In addition to shared progression with Modern Warfare II, Warzone 2.0 also features shared cross-platform progression and social aspects with Warzone Mobile, a new Warzone title made exclusively for mobile devices.

Maps

Al Mazrah
Al Mazrah is a large desert-themed map with nearly 20 points of interest, and is used as the primary Battle Royale map, as well as an Exclusion Zone for DMZ. The map is larger compared to previous Battle Royale maps in Warzone, a la Verdansk and Caldera, and features more water-based areas, allowing players to take advantage of new swimming and underwater combat mechanics introduced in Modern Warfare II.

Ashika Island
Ashika Island is a small-sized Asian Pacific-themed map, which serves as the primary locale for the Resurgence mode. The map notably features several surrounding water-based points of interest, complemented by Japanese towns, markets, and a castle area at the center.

Reception 

Call of Duty: Warzone 2.0 received "generally favorable" reviews, according to review aggregator Metacritic.

Notes

References 

2022 video games
Activision games
Battle royale games
First-person shooters
Free-to-play video games
Infinity Ward games
Raven Software games
Video games containing battle passes
Video games developed in the United States
Video games with cross-platform play
PlayStation 4 games
PlayStation 4 Pro enhanced games
PlayStation 5 games
Windows games
Xbox One games
Xbox One X enhanced games
Xbox Series X and Series S games